Bernard Harold Ian Halley Stewart, Baron Stewartby,  (10 August 1935 – 3 March 2018) was a British Conservative Party politician and numismatist. He was the Member of Parliament for Hitchin from February 1974 to 1983, and for North Hertfordshire from 1983 to 1992. He sat in the House of Lords from 1992 to 2015.

Early life

Stewart was the son of Harold Charles Stewart FRSE and Dorothy Irene Lowen, and was named after his grandfather, Bernard Halley Stewart. He was educated at Haileybury College and Jesus College, Cambridge, where he gained a first-class degree in the Classical Tripos; he was made an honorary fellow of the college in 1994.

Parliamentary career

Stewart contested Hammersmith North at the 1970 general election, being beaten by Labour's Frank Tomney. He was Member of Parliament for Hitchin from February 1974 to 1983, and for North Hertfordshire from 1983 until he stood down in 1992. He served as junior minister for Defence Procurement, Economic Secretary to the Treasury, and Minister for the Armed Forces.

House of Lords
After he left the House of Commons, Stewart was created a life peer as Baron Stewartby, of Portmoak in the District of Perth and Kinross on 20 July 1992. He sat in the House of Lords until his retirement on 12 November 2015.

Interest in numismatics
Stewartby's interest in Scottish coins had started when he was a schoolboy. Noting the lack of a complete book on the subject more recent than Edward Burns' 1887 work "Coinage of Scotland", he was encouraged to write his own. The result, "The Scottish Coinage", was published by Spink and Son in 1955. The preface, dated December 1953, gives the location as Haileybury College, Hertford, which he attended from 1949 to 1954, as a member of Allenby House.

In July 2007, Stewartby's collection of antique Scottish coins dating back to the 12th century and worth an estimated £500,000 was stolen from his home near Peebles. The coins have yet to be recovered, and in November 2008, a £50,000 reward was offered for their return.

Honours
In 1971, Stewartby was awarded the Sanford Saltus Gold Medal by the British Numismatic Society in recognition of his contributions to British numismatics. He was awarded the medal of the Royal Numismatic Society in 1996.

On 30 March 1970, Stewartby was elected a Fellow of the Society of Antiquaries of London (FSA). In 1981, he was elected a Fellow of the British Academy (FBA) in the Archaeology section. In 1986, he was elected a Fellow of the Royal Society of Edinburgh (FRSE).

In the 1991 Queen's Birthday Honours, he was appointed a Knight Bachelor "for political service". On 26 November, he received the accolade from Queen Elizabeth II at Buckingham Palace.

Arms

Sources
Times Guide to the House of Commons 1987

1935 births
2018 deaths
Conservative Party (UK) MPs for English constituencies
Stewartby
Members of the Privy Council of the United Kingdom
UK MPs 1974
UK MPs 1974–1979
UK MPs 1979–1983
UK MPs 1983–1987
UK MPs 1987–1992
British numismatists
Fellows of the British Academy
Fellows of the Royal Society of Edinburgh
Fellows of the Society of Antiquaries of London
Knights Bachelor
Alumni of Jesus College, Cambridge
Politicians awarded knighthoods
Northern Ireland Office junior ministers
Royal Naval Volunteer Reserve personnel
Life peers created by Elizabeth II